Paulo Henrique Chagas de Lima (born 12 October 1989), known as Paulo Henrique Ganso or just Ganso (lit. "goose" in Portuguese), is a Brazilian professional footballer who plays for Fluminense as an attacking midfielder.

A Santos youth graduate, Ganso was a part of the club's 2010 squad which earned many plaudits due to its playing style, and lifted a number of trophies with the club which included the 2011 Copa Libertadores. In 2012, he moved to São Paulo, being named the best midfielder in the 2014 Campeonato Brasileiro Série A before joining Sevilla in 2016. He could not establish himself as a starter at the Spanish side, and in 2019, after a brief period on loan at Amiens, he returned to his home country with Fluminense.

In 2009, Ganso received a nomination for the Brazilian Football Confederation award for "Breakthrough Player" of the Campeonato Brasileiro Série A, given to the best rookie of the competition.

Club career

Santos
Ganso was brought to Tuna Luso after being discovered by former Brazil international Giovanni, and at 15 years of age he joined Paysandu, but he was snapped up by Santos in 2005.

In 2007, after an injury that sidelined him for six months, Ganso played in and won the final of the U-20 Campeonato Paulista. He wore the number 10 jersey in Santos' campaign in the Copa São Paulo of 2008, where his team was eliminated in the quarter-finals by Sport Club Internacional. He won the 2010 Campeonato Paulista with Santos on 2 May 2010, defeating Santo André in the final.

In August 2010, it was reported that Ganso would have surgery on his injured left knee and would be out for six months.

In October 2010, Santos offered "agent company" DIS Group (subsidiary of Sonda Group, a Brazil supermarket chain; the D stands for Sonda president Delcir Sonda) to buy 70% image rights of the player, but the group did not accept the offer. He had a contract which would last until 28 February 2015 with a termination fee of €50 million. Group DIS reportedly owned 45% of the sporting rights of Ganso (which made the group eligible to receive a 45% transfer fee from Santos) after the court ruled in their favour.

São Paulo
On 20 September 2012, after a hard period of negotiation, it was confirmed by São Paulo that Ganso had signed a five-year contract, for a R$23.940 million transfer fee. Ganso would wear the number 8, previously used by Fabrício.

After getting back in great shape, Ganso was praised by his coach in São Paulo, Muricy Ramalho. According to Ramalho, who worked with Ganso in Santos, when both of them won 2011 Copa Libertadores, and in October 2013, when his number 8 shirt passed Jádson as the main assistant of Tricolor in the 2013 season: "Now, we have a number 10 shirt." In Brazil, this number is associated with playmaking.

Ganso started 2014 in a bad phase, but after Jádson left in a negotiation that brought Alexandre Pato to São Paulo FC he was awarded the number 10 shirt, and was hopeful that the  number would give him confidence, and that his performances would improve. Ganso stated: "I am very happy to wear the shirt of São Paulo and, now, to be given the number 10 shirt. This number was already worn by so many good players and I feel an immense happiness to be among them. My playing style is more traditional and I am told that a number 10 must know how to play in this manner. I think I will be able to combine the efficient with the aesthetic: classic football with the number 10 shirt."

Sevilla
On 16 July 2016, Ganso signed to La Liga Spanish side Sevilla FC for a fee of €10 million. He scored his first league goals for the club on 21 April 2017, netting a brace in a 2–0 win over Granada.

Loan to Amiens
On 31 August 2018, the last day of the 2018 summer transfer window, Ganso joined Ligue 1 club Amiens SC on a season-long loan. Amiens secured an option to sign him permanently.

Fluminense
On 31 January 2019, Ganso returned to Brazil and signed a five-year contract with Fluminense.

International career
In 2009, he was called up to play for Brazil in the World Under-20 Championships. In early 2010, the Brazilian media began calling for Brazilian national team coach Dunga to choose Ganso for the 2010 World Cup in South Africa, primarily as a substitute for Kaká, because of their similar styles of play. On 11 May 2010, he was named as one of seven backup players for the 23-man 2010 FIFA World Cup Brazil squad. On 26 July 2010, he was called up by the new coach Mano Menezes to the "Seleção" for a friendly match against USA. On 10 August 2010, in a friendly against the USA he made his senior debut, where one of his shots rattled the post, almost giving him his first senior international goal.
He was named in Mano Menezes 23-man 2011 Copa América squad and was given the number 10 shirt. During their second group game against Paraguay, on 9 July, Ganso assisted Jádson's goal as well as a last minute equalising goal from Fred to tie the game at 2–2. Brazil were later eliminated by Paraguay in the quarter-finals of the tournament, following a penalty shoot-out.

Ganso took part in the 2012 Summer Olympics in London, where Brazil achieved a silver medal.

Following injuries to Douglas Costa and Kaká, Ganso was called up to Brazil's Copa América Centenario squad as a replacement by Dunga, and was named in the 23-man final list, being given the number 7 shirt.

Style of play
Ganso is capable of playing anywhere in midfield, and is regarded as a talented and elegant offensive left-footed playmaker, with excellent dribbling skills, ball control, balance, vision, and passing ability, who excels at providing assists for teammates. In addition to his creative and technical abilities, Ganso also possesses a powerful and accurate shot from distance; he is also capable of aiding his team defensively, due to his stamina, height, and physical qualities, and can also play as a central midfielder or as a deep-lying playmaker. Regarded as highly promising prospect in his youth, his efficient rather than flamboyant playing style initially drew comparisons with compatriot Kaká; despite his talent, however, he has been criticised by some in the media in recent years for his lack of pace, mobility, and dynamism, as well as his poor work-rate and lack of consistency, which has led him to be accused of not living up to his potential. He is also known to be injury–prone.

Ganso has been a fundamental presence in midfield for both Santos and São Paulo, due to the enormous quality of his passes. After being a potential favorite name to wear the number 10 shirt for Brazil in the 2010 FIFA World Cup, Ganso was not called up for the tournament by Dunga, the nation's national football coach at the time, as the number 10 shirt went to Kaká. After suffering recurring injuries and a decrease in form and match fitness, he subsequently lost his place in the Brazilian team, in favour of Oscar, due to his performances with his club at the time, Chelsea. In 2012, Ganso refound his form and put on a notable performance in the derby against Corinthians, helping his team to a 3–1 victory, and, in 2013, he shone in a 2–0 win against Atlético Mineiro, as São Paulo advanced to the third stage of the 2013 Copa Libertadores.

After Muricy Ramalho's arrival, Ganso had put on good performances. On 16 October 2013, he scored a notable goal in São Paulo's 3–0 victory over Náutico in the Brazilian League, dribbling past four opponents before shooting on goal past the keeper.

Career statistics

Club

International
.

Honours
Santos
 Copa do Brasil: 2010
 Copa Libertadores: 2011
 Recopa Sudamericana: 2012

São Paulo
 Copa Sudamericana: 2012

Fluminense
 Campeonato Carioca: 2022

Individual
 Copa do Brasil Best Player: 2010
 Bola de Prata: 2014
South American Team of the Year: 2011
 Campeonato Paulista Team of the year: 2010, 2012

References

External links

 
 
 

1989 births
Living people
Association football midfielders
Brazilian footballers
Campeonato Brasileiro Série A players
La Liga players
Ligue 1 players
Santos FC players
São Paulo FC players
Sevilla FC players
Amiens SC players
Fluminense FC players
Brazil international footballers
Copa Libertadores-winning players
Brazilian expatriate sportspeople in Spain
Expatriate footballers in Spain
Expatriate footballers in France
2011 Copa América players
Footballers at the 2012 Summer Olympics
Copa América Centenario players
Olympic footballers of Brazil
Olympic silver medalists for Brazil
Olympic medalists in football
Brazil youth international footballers
Medalists at the 2012 Summer Olympics
Brazil under-20 international footballers
Sportspeople from Pará